Marita Aeschbacher (born 7 May 1941) is a Swiss equestrian. She competed in the 1972 Summer Olympics.

References

1941 births
Living people
Equestrians at the 1972 Summer Olympics
Swiss female equestrians
Swiss dressage riders
Olympic equestrians of Switzerland